The 2010 SEC men's basketball tournament was held March 11–14, 2010 in Nashville, Tennessee at Bridgestone Arena. The first, quarterfinal, and semifinal rounds were televised by SEC Network and the semifinals and finals were broadcast nationwide on ABC, with the exception of the majority of South Carolina markets.

The weekend games did not air in the market of the South Carolina Gamecocks in Columbia. ABC affiliate WOLO pre-empted the game and aired the 2010 ACC men's basketball tournament semifinal and final matches instead, per syndication contract with Raycom Sports, with the current Raycom-WOLO contract continuing until the 2011 tournament. The games also did not air in the Greenville-Spartanburg area (also Asheville, NC), as ABC affiliate WLOS also aired the ACC tournament. Raycom had owned the syndication rights to SEC sports prior to this season.

Seeds 

All twelve SEC schools played in the tournament. Teams were seeded by 2009–10 SEC season record, with a tiebreaker system to seed teams with identical conference records. The top 2 teams in each division received a first round bye.

The seeds for the tournament were as follows:

Schedule

Bracket

References 

SEC men's basketball tournament
2009–10 Southeastern Conference men's basketball season
Basketball competitions in Nashville, Tennessee
2010 in sports in Tennessee
College sports tournaments in Tennessee